Dambagolla is a village in Sri Lanka. It is located within Central Province which is quite central.

See also
List of towns in Central Province, Sri Lanka

External links

Populated places in Central Province, Sri Lanka